Touch My Heart is a studio album by country music artist Ray Price. It was released in 1967 by Columbia Records (catalog no. CL-2606).

The album debuted on Billboard magazine's country album chart on January 28, 1967, peaked at No. 1, and remained on the chart for a total of 35 weeks. The album included two singles that became Top 10 hits: "Touch My Heart" (No. 3) and "A Way to Survive" (No. 7).

AllMusic gave the album four-and-a-half stars.

Track listing
Side A
 "Touch My Heart" [3:06]
 "There Goes My Everything" [2:58]
 "It's Only Love" [3:11]
 "I Lie A Lot" [2:45]
 "You Took My Happy Away" [2:45]
 "Swinging Doors" [3:00]

Side B
 "A Way To Survive" [2:58]
 "The Same Two Lips" [3:11]
 "Enough To Lie" [2:42]
 "Am I That Easy to Forget" [2:19]
 "Just For The Record" [2:51]

References

1967 albums
Ray Price (musician) albums
Columbia Records albums